Michel Parès (2 August 1887 - 3 November 1966) was a French politician.

Parès was born in Rivesaltes. He represented the Republican Federation in the Chamber of Deputies from 1931 to 1936.

References

1887 births
1966 deaths
People from Pyrénées-Orientales
Politicians from Occitania (administrative region)
Republican Federation politicians
Members of the 14th Chamber of Deputies of the French Third Republic
Members of the 15th Chamber of Deputies of the French Third Republic